New Brighton is a city in Ramsey County, Minnesota, United States. It is a suburb of the Twin Cities. The population was 22,753 at the 2020 census.

History
In the mid 18th century, Mdewakanton Dakota tribes lived in the vicinity of New Brighton's marshy lakes, harvesting wild rice. The Dakota eventually settled a village near Long Lake at Rice Creek and a smaller encampment just east of Silver Lake Road on 3rd Street NW. Immigrants from Britain and France settled a small village in 1858 which included a general store, school and mission church. As railroads were established in the area, millers in Minneapolis formed the Minneapolis Stockyards and Packing Company in 1888. The company supplied home, agriculture, and business needs. The venture included Minneapolis figures such as streetcar magnate Thomas Lowry, flour millers John Sargent Pillsbury, Senator William D. Washburn, ex-Minneapolis Mayor W.H. Eustis, and industrialist W.H. Dunwoody. As the village grew in prominence, it was incorporated on January 20, 1891.  The city was given the name Brighton after Brighton, Massachusetts.  The founding population was primarily English-American. Each August, a city festival celebrates this heritage, called the Stockyard Days and is held at Long Lake Park.

As the streetcar system expanded in the early 20th century, immigrant and first-generation groups from Eastern Europe and Germany began moving outwards from Northeast Minneapolis. New Brighton and St. Anthony residents also continue to celebrate this ethnic heritage with an annual Polka Dance Party which began in 1892.

In the 1920s, a local farmer said he heard a rumor that gold bars were buried along the eastern shore of Long Lake by bootleggers. This rumor spread and in the following years launched a mini "gold rush" along Long Lake to find the treasure.

Geography
Rice Creek flows through the northern part of the city.

New Brighton is located at the intersection of Interstate Highways 35W and 694. It is geographically incongruent. From north to south it is not even, and east to west it is even in only a few places. A piece of the city sits on the east side of Interstate 35W isolated from the rest of the city.

Nearby places include Arden Hills, Shoreview, Roseville, Saint Anthony Village, Columbia Heights, Fridley, Mounds View, and Minneapolis.

New Brighton is part of east–central Minnesota's glacial plain sandpile, which was flattened by glaciers during the most recent glacial advance. The Wisconsin glaciation left 12,000 years ago. These glaciers covered all of Minnesota except the far southeast, an area characterized by steep hills and streams that cut into the bedrock. Since the New Brighton landscape is still recovering from the weight of the glaciers and going through post-glacial rebound and the turmoil this created, the landscape is poorly drained created the numerous lakes and rivers found in the city. Long Lake itself is the remnants of the glaciers, as it was a chunk of ice that was left behind, melted, and created the lake in the hole it occupied.

Demographics

2010 census
As of the census of 2010, there were 21,456 people, 8,915 households, and 5,731 families residing in the city. The racial makeup of the city was 84.2% White, 4.1% African American, 1.4% Native American, 4.8% Asian, 2.2% from other races, and 2.1% from two or more races. Hispanic or Latino of any race were 4.2% of the population.

There were 8,915 households, of which 28.4% had children under the age of 18 living with them, 49.3% were married couples living together, 10.8% had a female householder with no husband present, 4.2% had a male householder with no wife present, and 35.7% were non-families. 28.8% of all households were made up of individuals, and 10.8% had someone living alone who was 65 years of age or older. The average household size was 2.35 and the average family size was 2.89.

The median age in the city was 40.7 years. 21.1% of residents were under the age of 18; 9.4% were between the ages of 18 and 24; 24.5% were from 25 to 44; 27.2% were from 45 to 64; and 17.7% were 65 years of age or older. The gender makeup of the city was 48.3% male and 51.7% female.

2000 census
As of the census of 2000, there were 22,206 people, 9,013 households, and 5,903 families residing in the city. The racial makeup of the city was 88.19% White, 3.02% African American, 2.62% Native American, 3.38% Asian, 0.06% Pacific Islander, 0.84% from other races, and 2.20% from two or more races. Hispanic or Latino of any race were 1.77% of the population.

There were 9,013 households, out of which 28.7% had children under the age of 18 living with them, 52.4% were married couples living together, 10.0% had a female householder with no husband present, and 34.5% were non-families. 26.1% of all households were made up of individuals, and 7.8% had someone living alone who was 65 years of age or older. The average household size was 2.40 and the average family size was 2.91.

In the city the population was spread out, with 22.2% under the age of 18, 11.3% from 18 to 24, 28.7% from 25 to 44, 25.6% from 45 to 64, and 12.6% who were 65 years of age or older. The median age was 37 years. For every 100 females there were 94.8 males. For every 100 females age 18 and over, there were 91.4 males.

The median income for a household in the city was $52,856, and the median income for a family was $68,724. Males had a median income of $45,291 versus $32,021 for females. The per capita income for the city was $27,574. About 3.3% of families and 4.7% of the population were below the poverty line, including 5.5% of those under age 18 and 3.9% of those age 65 or over.

Government

New Brighton has a Council / Manager form of city government. The City Council meets the second and fourth Tuesdays of the month at New Brighton City Hall. Meetings are open to the public and are televised live on New Brighton's Government-access television (GATV) cable TV channel 16.

The following five citizens are the elected City Council:
 Mayor Kari Niedfeldt-Thomas
 Councilmember Abdullahi Abdulle
 Councilmember Pam Axberg 
 Councilmember Emily Dunsworth
 Councilmember Graeme Allen

Education
Four public schools are located in New Brighton: Bel Air Elementary School, Sunnyside Elementary, Highview Middle School, and Irondale High School; additionally, until 2005, when it was converted into a community education center, there was a fifth public school located in New Brighton: Pike Lake Kindergarten Center, now known as Pike Lake Education Center. All of these schools are part of the Mounds View Public Schools (District 621).

Nearby private high schools attended by residents include Totino-Grace in Fridley, Minnehaha Academy in Minneapolis, or Breck School in Golden Valley. High school students in a portion of eastern New Brighton attend nearby Mounds View High School. A small fraction of New Brighton students attend Wilshire Park Elementary and Saint Anthony Village Middle and High Schools in nearby Saint Anthony Village, as part of New Brighton is served by ISD 282.

References in popular culture

In the 1993 film In the Line of Fire, assassin-in-training Mitch Leary (John Malkovich) pretends to be from Minneapolis. He is unprepared when asked by a Minneapolitan which high school he attended. Leary answers "New Brighton High School". The questioner replies that there is no New Brighton High School, but she can't remember the name of the high school in New Brighton. This exchange proves to be important to the plot.

New Brighton was the based location on an episode of the true crime drama Fear Thy Neighbor, in the episode "Nightmare Next Door."

References

External links
City website

Cities in Ramsey County, Minnesota
Populated places established in 1891
1891 establishments in Minnesota
Cities in Minnesota